Derek Laxdal (born February 21, 1966) is a Canadian ice hockey coach and former professional right winger. In 2022, Laxdal was named the head coach of the Oshawa Generals.

Playing career 
Born and raised in Stonewall, Manitoba, Laxdal was drafted in the eighth round, 151st overall, by the Toronto Maple Leafs in the 1984 NHL Entry Draft. He played 67 games in the National Hockey League: 51 over four seasons with the Maple Leafs and 16 more over two seasons with the New York Islanders. In an almost 20-year career, he scored points at every level, including a successful four-year stint in the UK between 1995/96 and 1998/99, where he played for the Humberside Hawks, Nottingham Panthers and Sheffield Steelers.

Coaching career 
From December 10, 2019, until May 20,2022, Laxdal was an assistant coach with the Dallas Stars of the National Hockey League. From 2014 to 2019, he was the head coach of the American Hockey League affiliate of the Dallas Stars, the Texas Stars. Previously, he served as head coach of the WHL Edmonton Oil Kings and the ECHL Idaho Steelheads. In 2007, he was the ECHL John Brophy recipient of Coach of the Year. Laxdal led the Steelheads to the Kelly Cup championship in the 2006–07 season, and led the Edmonton Oil Kings to WHL titles in 2012 and 2014, winning the 2014 Memorial Cup with the Oil Kings. He is the first coach in the history of the WHL to have three 50 win seasons in a row.

Career statistics

Regular season and playoffs

References

External links

1966 births
Living people
Brandon Wheat Kings players
Canadian ice hockey right wingers
Capital District Islanders players
Dallas Stars coaches
Denver Daredevils players
ECHL coaches
Edmonton Oil Kings coaches
Ice hockey people from Manitoba
Ilves players
New Westminster Bruins players
New York Islanders players
Newmarket Saints players
Nottingham Panthers players
Odessa Jackalopes players
Ottawa Loggers players
People from Gimli, Manitoba
People from Stonewall, Manitoba
Portland Winterhawks players
Roanoke Express players
St. Catharines Saints players
Sheffield Steelers players
Springfield Indians players
Toronto Maple Leafs draft picks
Toronto Maple Leafs players
Wichita Thunder coaches
Canadian expatriate ice hockey players in England
Canadian expatriate ice hockey players in Finland
Canadian ice hockey coaches